Nikola Mektić and Franko Škugor were the defending champions but chose not to defend their title.

Guillermo Durán and Andrés Molteni won the title after defeating Jonathan Eysseric and Tristan Lamasine 6–3, 6–7(4–7), [13–11] in the final.

Seeds

Draw

References
 Main Draw

Open d'Orléans - Doubles
2017 Doubles